|}

The Altcar Novices' Chase is a Grade 2 National Hunt steeplechase in Great Britain which is open to horses aged five years or above. It is run at Haydock Park over a distance of about 2 miles and 4 furlongs (2 miles 3 furlongs and 203 yards, or 4,099 metres), and during its running there are seventeen fences to be jumped. The race is for novice chasers, and it is scheduled to take place each year in January.

The race was first run in 1996.  Between 2000 and 2005, the race was run over a distance of 2 miles and 6 furlongs, before being switched back to its current distance in 2006. From 2012 to 2016, it was run under various sponsored titles.

Winners

See also
 Horse racing in Great Britain
 List of British National Hunt races

References
Racing Post:

National Hunt races in Great Britain
Haydock Park Racecourse
National Hunt chases
Recurring sporting events established in 1996
1996 establishments in England